Lolita Yermak (born 22 March 1996) is a Ukrainian ice dancer. With her partner Oleksiy Shumsky, she is the 2014 International Cup of Nice bronze medalist.

With former partner Alexander Liubchenko she won Tirnavia Cup (2010) gold medalist,  Ice Challenge Graz (2010) silver medalist.

Career 
Yermak competed with Taras Semotiuk early in her career. In 2010, she made her ISU Junior Grand Prix debut partnered with Alexander Liubchenko. They competed together for two seasons.

In 2012, Yermak teamed up with Oleksiy Khimich. They were sent to the 2013 World Junior Championships, where they placed 25th.

Later in 2013, Yermak teamed up with Oleksiy Shumsky and began competing on the senior level. They won the bronze medal at the Ukrainian Championships in December 2013 and silver medal in December 2014. Their first international medal, bronze, came at the Cup of Nice in October 2014. In February 2015 they were sent to the Winter Universiade, where they placed 9th.

Programs 
(with Shumsky)

Competitive highlights 
CS: Challenger Series; JGP: Junior Grand Prix

With Shumsky

With Khimich

With Liubchenko

References

External links 
 

Ukrainian female ice dancers
1996 births
Living people
Sportspeople from Kharkiv
Competitors at the 2015 Winter Universiade
21st-century Ukrainian women
20th-century Ukrainian women